(Everyman), Op. 83, is incidental music by Jean Sibelius to Hugo von Hofmannsthal's play of the same name. The music consists of 16 numbers, and it is scored for mixed chorus, orchestra, piano and organ. Robert Kajanus conducted the Helsinki City Orchestra in the first performance at Helsinki's National Theatre on 5 November 1916. Sibelius arranged in 1925−26 three movements for piano: Episodio, Scèna and Canzone.

After its premiere in 1916, the work became one of the most neglected of his compositions. Nevertheless, it has been considered a hidden gem.

Discography 
The table below lists all commercially available recordings of the complete incidental music to Everyman:

References 

Incidental music by Jean Sibelius
1916 compositions
Everyman